The N type carriages are an intercity passenger carriage used on the railways of Victoria, Australia. They were introduced between 1981 and 1984 as part of the 'New Deal' reforms of country passenger rail services. Today they are seen on both V/Line long distance InterCity services, and limited commuter services to Geelong.

The carriage sets have both first class 2+2 seating, and 2+3 economy seating. Snack bar facilities are also provided on board. Originally delivered as three-car sets, some sets were extended in length with S and Z type carriages.

Today the carriages are hauled by N class diesel locomotives. The carriages can use an external head end power supply for lighting and air conditioning operation. Each carriage has two swing doors per side, which were originally manually opened by passengers, but have since been converted to powered operation, and they are locked or unlocked by the conductor. Toilets, drinking fountains and luggage areas are provided throughout each carriage set.

History
The order for the N type carriages was placed in 1977 for 30 carriages (10 sets) for use on the Geelong line, with six cars added to the order in 1978 for the Ballarat line, due to a by-election in the city. Under the New Deal of 1981 the order was extended to 54 carriages, and then to 57 due to cost savings during construction. They were built between 1981 and 1984, based upon the structural design of the Victorian Z type carriages built between 1956 and 1960.

In 2007 V/Line commenced a refurbishment program for their existing H type carriages and Sprinter railcars, this program later being extended to the N type carriages. In October 2007 the first refurbished N type carriage was released into traffic with the new V/Line grey exterior livery, as well as updated interior curtains and seat fabrics.

As part of the Albury line upgrade some N carriages were converted to standard gauge. Three sets (consisting of 5 carriages and one power/luggage van) have already been formed, and they are named SN1, SN15 and SN16.

Services
N sets are used on lines including:
 the North-East line, to Shepparton
 the Gippsland line, to Bairnsdale
 the Bendigo line, to Swan Hill
 the Geelong line, to Geelong, South Geelong, Marshall and Warrnambool

Design
The design of the N-type carriages was based on the earlier Z-type ones, but with the benefit of thirty years of construction and design experience.

The first-class carriages were fitted with blue-wool seating and blue/grey carpets. The second-class carriages were furnished with orange seats and a russet (tan/brown) carpet. All materials were fire-retardant, and non-skid Pirelli flooring was fitted at the entrances and service areas; in blue to match the carpets in the first class areas, and in maroon for the second class areas. Following customer feedback, the seating arrangements in the economy cars were reorganised to place the centres of back-to-back seats in line with pillars between windows.

Two-stage air-conditioning was fitted for summer, and heating elements placed underneath the carpet for winter. Those systems, along with those for lighting and announcements, were powered by three-phase alternators, fixed to the underframe of each carriage. These required refuelling, but were cheaper and more reliable than the axle-driven generators used in most earlier vehicles.

One unisex toilet was provided at the west end of each carriage, along with hot water for each wash basin, fed from a 635-litre pressurised tank. The system met the Environmental Protection Agency's requirements as they existed in 1981.

Inter-carriage access diaphragms are constructed with rubber tubing, in place of the earlier method using canvas attached to steel frames. The doors for inter-carriage links were 3 ft (914mm) wide.

Bogies
The bogies for the new cars were a new design, specifically prepared by Vickers Ruwolt. The suspension was based on coil springs, with a secondary cast bolster with spring plank, supported on swing links and coil springs. Each bogie weighed 7000 kg, with a wheelbase of 2,445mm and a maximum axle load of 14 tonnes, and were designed for operation at up to 130 km/h. Tread brakes were fitted, operated by Westinghouse model 250WF brake cylinders. The axle boxes utilised spherical roller bearings, and all parts of the bogie, except the wheels and axles themselves, were designed for conversion to standard gauge. This latter function was finally used in 2009 when the Seymour to Albury line was converted to standard gauge.

Power supplies
The diesel alternator sets for the carriages provided 3-phase 415-volt alternating current power. Only 1 phase was required for operation, so the other two phases were available for backup or for load-sharing across other carriages - useful because the ACN and BN cars required 28 kW to operate and the BRN, with its additional functions, 40 kW. To accommodate the extra load, the ACN and BN were upgraded midway through construction to a 35kVA supply, and the programming reworked so that the BRN would not power adjacent cars. If all alternators were off, then the cars was able to take power from an external 240vAC power supply. Around the same time as these modifications were made, the alternator set supports were modified to reduce vibration, and the radiator fan motors' thermal overload switches were moved to reduce unnecessary tripping. At the end of the modifications, the system was organised so that in event of a power failure, the batteries mounted under the carriages would automatically reroute all power to the lights at the ends of the train to protect from oncoming traffic. Those lights could function for over ten hours, at the expense of air-conditioning and other functions. The first six cars had plastic fuel pipes near the alternator units, but that was changed from car 7 onwards.

Construction
The N type carriages were the first cars to be built at Newport Workshops in over 20 years. Each carriage took over 20 weeks to construct, with a rolling production line to give one new carriage off the assembly line every fortnight. Weeks 1 to 7 involved the general structure - welding the shell and the underframe together and attaching the ends. Following that, the electrical fitout took four weeks, and the bogies were fitted after Week 11. A mineral fibre insulation was sprayed on internal surfaces between weeks 12-14, and then the final six weeks the internal fibreglass ceiling and wall sheets were fitted, along with carpet, seats, lighting, doors and other components, with a one-week trial at the end. The cost was roughly $500,000 per carriage. The total build time added to 16,500 man-hours per carriage, against 32,000 for the earlier Z type carriages. Additionally, the carriages are between five and eight tonnes heavier than comparable designs overseas, partially due to their being a compromise between regional and commuter type vehicles. On the other hand, they cost a mere $13,000 per seat, against $47,000 per seat for the XPT carriages being built for New South Wales Railways around the same time.

The shells of the carriages were constructed with Lyten Steel, selected for its high strength and anti-corrosion properties. The paint used externally is identical to aircraft mixes, both in domestic and overseas application. It has been suggested that the orange scheme for VicRail was selected due to spare lots of paint available cheaply when Ansett Australia changed from its orange scheme, but this has not been proven.

The initial plan called for three-carriage sets of ACN-BN-BN, where the latter two cars in each set would be identical with second-class seating. By the time the New Deal was properly fleshed out other new carriages were deemed impractical, so after sets 1 through 6 had entered service, set 7 had the experimental BRN20 included in its consist with a modular buffet section. During the tests sets 8 and 9 entered service in the original configuration, then set 10 as ACN-BRN-BN, and sets 11 through 18 were constructed with two buffet cars; as they were released to service the most-recent of the ACN-BN-BN sets was recalled to Newport Workshops for a carriage swap, so that eventually all sets were of the ACN-BRN-BN configuration. (Set 19, added at the end of the project, was released as ACN-BRN-BN, just like set N10.)

Most carriages were fitted with automatic couplers with an implicit agreement that sets would not be separated; one of the sets in the mid-1930s had drawbars fitted between its three carriages experimentally. The automatic couplers were expected to be temporary, with scharfenberg couplers expected in June 1983 to replace them and the hard-wired electrical and pneumatic links between carriages. However, a derailment in late 2011 revealed that set SN1 on the standard gauge still had autocouplers between the carriages.

A snapshot of the production line timeline is available in Newsrail, September 1982, p. 197. It lists sets N1 through N9 complete, with the carriages forming N10 through N14 at various stages of construction and fit-out, and the frames of the 43rd carriage being welded together as of 28 July 1982.

Shell 19
Carriage shell number 19 was delayed in construction as it was selected for the trial buffet module equipment. As a result, car 20 became BN19, and car 19 entered service as BRN20. The car was also used to test alternative carriage side materials, such as corrugated stainless steel sheeting; this was eventually rejected and normal carriage side material was fitted in its place. A sketch of the proposal is provided in Newsrail, June 1982, p. 113.

The buffet modules, developed by Smallwood & Leibert, were intended to fit through the carriage doorways and then be assembled in situ. The new carriage design was tested on daily return trips from Melbourne to Bendigo, with additional runs to Albury and Gippsland before it officially entered service. In practice the module was too heavy for the carriage design and had to be modified, as the offset weight gave the body a lean of "almost three inches" - this was rectified by temporarily modifying the bogie spring layout. BRN29, the next of the type to enter service, was reorganised with the buffet on the north side of the car (following east and west end convention), and at the end of the project BRN20 was modified to match the standard of the rest of the fleet.

Scharfenberg couplers
As an experiment, BRN33 was fitted with scharfenberg coupler drawbars in lieu of normal automatic couplers during construction.

Details
N type carriages are individually numbered in the 1 to 57 series. Sets were issued to traffic with three types of carriage:
 ACN first class (2+2 seating, recline and rotate) with conductors van, 52 seats
 BRN economy class (2+3 seating, fixed) with snack bar, 67 seats
 BN economy class (2+3 seating, fixed), 88 seats

The BRN cars were a late addition to the concept, and the majority had their final two windows on the buffet side merely painted over. BRN cars 20, 47 and 52 are the only ones known to have been built without those two windows.

From 1995 surplus Z type carriages were upgraded to N type interiors, with the following codes but with their original Z type numbers:
 BZN economy class (2+3 seating, fixed) with disabled access and toilet, 72 seats
 BTN economy class (2+3 seating, fixed), 88 seats

In 2009 a new code was introduced in conjunction with the formation of 'pure' 5-car N sets for standard gauge use:
 BDN economy class (2+3 seating, fixed) with disabled access and toilet (interior similar to a BZN carriage), 72 seats.

In service

VicRail & V/Line Orange Era (1981-1995)
The first N sets introduced, N1 and N2, entered service on the Melbourne-bound train from South Geelong, at 6:50am on Monday October 5, 1981. The train split at Spencer Street station, with set N1 running to then from Horsham before forming an evening Geelong run, and set N2 running to Ballarat and return, then to South Geelong in the evening and shunting back to Geelong yard. On Saturday 10th one set ran to Spencer Street then formed a return Horsham (same as weekdays, excluding South Geelong), while the other set ran four return Geelong trips. On Sunday 11th both sets were coupled, for a Geelong to Spencer St run, then a return Bendigo and Swan Hill run, then back to Geelong. Set N3 entered service on one of the five Warrnambool/Ballarat/Shepparton rosters, replacing a set of cars CE-AS-BEa/c-BW; those cars were split, with the AS to a Gippsland set and the BEac to a Numurkah set. Set N4 then became the first "spare" N roster, available for service form 19 May 1982 if one of the other three was unable to run for any reason. The fifth set entered service on 19 June, running Tuesdays to Friday on the 7am from Ballarat to Spencer Street with the return departure at 5:58pm. The set also ran a Horsham 9:30am outbound, 4:15pm inbound on Saturdays, and joined the existing Horsham train for extra capacity on Sundays.

The plan as at early 1982 was for all 54 carriages (not yet 57) to be in service by the end of 1983, running services to Warrnambool, Horsham, Shepparton, Geelong and some Bendigo services. All other services were to be provided by the existing S, Z and airconditioned E carriages, plus interurban Comeng type trains running to Traralgon. All carriages were to be formed into semi-fixed 3 or 4-car sets, with schedules built around standard consists to keep runs fast and simple. Additionally, all sets were to include only one conductor/guard van, rather than one each end, to maximise capacity for length and weight of each train set. The roster at the time worked with fourteen interurban trains (plus four on the electrified eastern region), so that would allow enough N sets spare and in rostered maintenance.

As of June 1982, the roster included four N sets in service, N3 through N6, with one spare and one undergoing modifications. At the time, set N7 was due to be introduced on the Gippslander run to Bairnsdale on the week beginning 31 May; N8 and N9 had already entered service, and were stabled at Ballarat and Bendigo respectively, and had replaced CE-AS-BEac-BWL sets. The AS cars went to Ballarat Workshops for rebuilding, and the airconditioned BE cars replaced non-airconditioned cars in other sets. Further rebalancing of stock allowed the N sets to run on Dimboola trains, as accelerated schedules made return trips practical. The fleet roster at the time was expected to last at least until the end of October, at which point half of the N cars would have been delivered.

An excerpt of the roster "N9" (i.e. the 9th roster post New Deal) as printed in the September 1982 Newsrail is provided below (amended November 1982 p. 283), showing the N car runs. Aside from these seven entries, a further 30 runs were scheduled, most including at least one airconditioned carriage. "SSS" is shorthand for Spencer Street station, meaning the platforms and not indicating the shunt in or out of yards.

Roster N10 started 31 October 1982 with ten N sets in service, two with BRN buffet cars and eight all-sitting sets; of the latter, two were rostered as spares and six were in service. The buffet sets (N7 and N10) were rostered on the Warrnambool (1255 ex Spencer Street, returning 1600 in lieu of 1700 as above) and Horsham day return schedules, plus the 0835 and 1825 Saturday Warrnambool runs.

The additional ACN-BN-BN set ran the 0615 (formerly 0620) from South Geelong, going on to form the 0755 to Horsham; after returning to Melbourne it replaced the former 1315 railcar and trailer to Shepparton, as the new 1255 departure running parallel to the outbound Warrnambool. On Saturdays it ran the 0700 city to South Geelong, and on Sunday it ran to Numurkah. The 1740 to Geelong was downgraded to a non-airconditioned timber set, but the 1645 to South Geelong was increased to the 1605 from Bendigo (as above), plus the 1600 N set arrival from Warrnambool. While previously the 0824 double N set formed the Warrnambool and Shepparton services, these were retimed to 0835 and 0855 respectively and formed by the 0800 (retimed to 0758) arrival. Instead, the 0824 double set arrival from Geelong was shunted to Spencer Street yard until the afternoon, leaving other sets to take the Ballarat and Horsham services.

Around the same time, the proposals for Comeng interurban trains for the Traralgon line were dropped, as they would not have been available until 1986; and so concepts for further carriages following the delivery of the 54 N cars were being prepared. In practice the further order never developed.

By late 1983, roster N18 had fifteen of the eighteen N sets in service and the remaining three under rostered maintenance. This included regularly running on the Gippsland line in lieu of the proposed interurban services. Under that roster, N sets ran return trips:
 1 per week to Albury (Friday night outbound, Sunday morning return)
 34 per week to Ballarat
 9 per week to Bendigo
 7 per week to Cobram
 6 per week to Dimboola (Sunday excluded)
 38 per week to Geelong (including one double set, Sunday to Thursday)
 7 per week to Horsham (including one double set on Sunday)
 10 per week to Kyneton
 6 per week to Shepparton (Sunday excluded)
 17 per week to South Geelong (including one double set, Monday to Friday)
 1 per week to Swan Hill (double set, Sunday only)
 26 per week to Traralgon (including one double set on Sunday)
 17 per week to Warrnambool (including one double set on Saturday)

V/Line Passenger Red Era (1995-2007)
All N type carriages were transferred across to V/Line Passenger when the country rail operator was split between freight and passenger divisions in 1995.
In 1995, Z cars began to be converted to BZN carriages. Progressively, Z sets began to be eliminated as a result of the introduction of the Sprinter railcars. Subsequently, spare BZ and BZS cars were converted to BZN cars. The interior of these cars were roughly based on the N type car layout, but in an old Z car. The code BZN indicates that it is an economy car, with Z indicating its former use as a Z car, and N indicating it being classified as an N car. By 1998, 8 cars had been converted to BZN cars. Ultimately, 14 cars were converted to BZN cars.

Later, 3 more Z cars were converted to the new BTN format in 2003. These were all former BCZ class economy cars. The first cars converted were 251, 253 and 254, which were later followed by several more. 7 cars were ultimiately converted to BTN cars. The interior arrangement of these cars had 88 seats, the same capacity as the BN class economy sitting cars.

An N set, N7, was involved in this accident, which killed 11 people The 3 cars in this set were ACN21, BRN20 and BN19. Carriage BRN20 was damaged beyond repair and was retired. Carriage ACN21 was initially paired with a number of BS cars to make up a new carriage set, however, it was ultimately rebuilt as BDN21 for standard gauge. Carriage BN19 was converted to standard gauge and placed in set SN1.

Carriage set FN2 was retired at an unknown time and its carriages were split elsewhere.

V/Line Passenger Grey Era (2007-2017)
2007 saw car BZN252 and BZN267 painted in a new mk3 livery. These cars were both newly converted from west coast Z cars to BZN cars - BZN252 from former first class car ACZ252, and BZN267 from former economy car BZ267. This was followed by carriage set VN12 as the first repainted, containing carriages ACN36, BRN35, BN23, and BZN273. Despite being coded a VN set, where the V indicates 5 carriages, there were only 4 cars for the initial runs of this set. Carriage set FN14 was the second repainted, and by 2016 the last car in mk2 (actually a Z car, BCZ257) was repainted into mk3. This meant all N-type carriages were painted in the grey livery. Despite the introduction of a new livery in 2017, various BTN and BZN cars remain in the mk3 livery attached to otherwise repainted mk4 sets.

V/Line Passenger Purple Era, Withdrawal and Preservation (2017-) 
In 2017, V/Line released a fourth carriage set for use on the Albury Line in 2017 with a new PTV livery. This was set SN8 (alongside locomotive N457), first running in April 2017. Followed by set VN3 a week later, the livery was subsequently applied to all N type (ACN/BN/BRN/BDN) carriages and some of the BZN/BTN fleet, though not all the ex-Z cars have received the livery.

The new Bairnsdale line timetable from the 28th of August 2018 brought an end to locomotive-hauled trains on 2 out of 3 daily services. Prior to this, all services except one return service to Sale on a sunday were operated by N sets. The remaining one return service to Bairnsdale per day will be replaced by a VLocity when stabling at Bairnsdale is completed.

The introduction of the standard gauge VLocity units in December 2021 marked the beginning of N set withdrawals, with set SN8 being transferred to the Seymour Railway Heritage Centre for indefinite storage on the 15th of January, 2022. Initially running on only the 12:05pm Albury and 5:20pm Southern Cross services, the timetable introduced on the 28th of August 2022 saw the removal of N sets from the Albury line.

Following the withdrawal of N sets on the Albury line, there were 4 sets of N cars no longer required, which were distributed to heritage organisations and storage facilities: 

 707 Operations now own ACN45, BRN43, BN5 from set SN15, as well as BN22 and ACN48 from set SN16, to be used for their journeys on standard gauge.
 Seymour Railway Heritage Centre now own ACN3, BRN53 and BN19 from SN1 and BRN46 from SN16, and are to be used for their standard gauge journeys.
 Steamrail Victoria own ACN24, BRN34 and BN10 from SN8, as well as car BN7, joining their fleet of K Type Carriages on Standard Gauge.
 Carriages BDN2, BDN6, BDN21 and BDN50 have been placed in storage at Ettamogah.
On the 5th October 2022, it was announced that from the 23rd October all Shepparton services would now operate using VLocity units, this is has been delayed until further notice due to flooding at Shepparton. This would result in the end of N set operations on services along the Seymour corridor.

Carriage sets
The N cars appear in fixed sets not altered in ordinary service. The sets are numbered between 1 and 19. Initially issued to service as 3-car sets, from 1995 additional cars of the BCZ, ACZ, BS, BZN or BTN type were attached to give longer sets. Additional cars may also be temporarily attached or detached to a set without the set code being altered.

 N: 3-car set ACN-BRN-BN (not commonly seen in regular service)
 FN: 4-car set ACN-BRN-(mix of 2x N/Z cars); while Z cars out of service, 1x temporary 4N set ACN-BRN-BN-BN.
 VN: 5-car set ACN-BRN-(mix of 3x N/Z cars); while Z cars out of service, 2x temporary 5N set ACN-BRN-ACN-BRN-BN.
 SN: 4-car set ACN-BRN-BDN-BN or 5-car set ACN-BRN-BDN-BN-BN on standard gauge.

The original plan was for 10, then 18 three car sets each of BN-BN-ACN; but when the cars needed on-board food supplies, set N07 had car BRN20 fitted with a buffet module in place of about 20 seats at the east end. Sets N08 and N09 were released as normal BN-BN-ACN sets while N07 was trialled, and when it was deemed a success and followed by N10 as BN-BRN-ACN, sets N11 through N18 were built as BRN-BRN-ACN. Then, as each set was made ready for service, the newest BN-BN-ACN set was recalled to the workshops for mixing cars, so that all sets ended up as BN-BRN-ACN. Set N19, built at the end of the program, was released as BN-BRN-ACN from the start, and at the end of the program BRN20 returned to the workshops for modifications to match the rest of the fleet.

Set history
Note: Colours are representative only, and do not directly correlate to liveries worn in the era. Also, the zero prefix in sets 1-9 below are incorrect but useful for sorting and searching purposes.

Image gallery

Model railways

HO Scale
As of July 2013, only HO scale plastic models of the N-series carriages are available produced by Auscision Models (although there have been brass models released in the past). Each set contains one each of the ACN, BRN and BN cars, plus a D boxvan van thought to have run on occasion with that consist. No spare N cars (not fixed in sets) have been made available in ready-to-run plastic. The same sets were rerun in 2016. As of April 2022, all sets are sold out.

In 2020, Powerline released a run of Z type carriages, containing some BZN and BTN cars. These included:

In V/Line Passenger Mk1 - BTN263, BTN264, BZN273 and BZN274

In V/Line Passenger Mk4 - BZN271, BZN262 and BTN253

However, the mk4 carriages have been heavily delayed and are not yet available as of April 2022. No carriages were produced in the mk2 or mk3 liveries.

N Scale
As of 2022, no ready-to-run N scale models of the N type carriages are available.

References

External links 

V/Linecars.com: N set information
Peter J Vincent: ACN cars
Peter J Vincent: BRN cars
Peter J Vincent: BN cars
Peter J Vincent: BZN cars

Victorian Railways carriages